Bill Tempero (born January 16, 1944) is an American former racing driver from Milwaukee. He raced in the CART Championship Car series from 1980 to 1984 competing in full seasons his first two years and partial schedules thereafter. He failed to qualify for both the races he attempted in 1984, so he was not credited with a race start that season. Tempero finished 20th in CART points in 1980 with two top-10 finishes including his series-best result of 6th place at the Milwaukee Mile while driving for Hopkins Racing. He fielded his own car in 1981 and 32nd in points without a single top-ten. He attempted to qualify for the Indianapolis 500 in 1980, 1981, and 1983 but failed to make the field in 1980 and 1983 and crashed while attempting to qualify in 1981.

After a decline in his performance in CART as costs and talent levels rose throughout the 1980s, Tempero went to the declining Can-Am series in 1984 and finished 4th and 2nd in championship points in his two seasons in the series, the series' final two years of operation in 1985 and 1986.

After the short stint, Can-Am finally folded, and Tempero led an effort to create a new series, the American Indycar Series in 1988. Tempero dominated the second-tier series, which featured year-old (and older) chassis from CART competition.

Tempero attempted to return to top-level open wheel racing in the Indy Racing League's first race at the Walt Disney World Speedway in 1996. His four-year-old Lola/Buick V6 failed to make the field, but the team continued to enter IRL races throughout 1996 for other drivers. Following his retirement from racing, Tempero pursued his interest in history, and currently serves as the president of the United States Cavalry Association.

Motorsport results

CART
(key) (Races in bold indicate pole position)

IRL IndyCar
(key) (Races in bold indicate pole position; races in italics indicate fastest lap)

SCCA National Championship Runoffs

References

External links
Bill Tempero at ChampCarStats.com

1944 births
Champ Car drivers
IndyCar Series team owners
Living people
Racing drivers from Milwaukee
Sportspeople from Milwaukee
Racing drivers from Wisconsin
SCCA National Championship Runoffs participants